The Gümüşlük International Music Festival is held in the small fishing village of Gümüşlük, Bodrum, on the southwest coast of Turkey. It began in 2004 and between 2006 and 2012 was organized by Bodrum Klasik Müzik Derneği (Classical Music Association of Bodrum), founded in 2006 for this purpose. In 2016 the festival expanded its programming to include a dedicated guitar week and a series of jazz concerts. The Gümüşlük Festival Academy is organized annually parallel to the festival.

References

External links
 Festival website
 Festival 2015 at the Turkish Daily News
 Festival 2014 at the Turkish Daily News
 Festival 2012 at the Turkish Daily News

Classical music festivals in Turkey
Music festivals established in 2004
Tourist attractions in Muğla Province
Annual events in Turkey
2004 establishments in Turkey